Helix mazzullii, also known as Cantareus mazzullii or Cornu mazzullii, is a species of large, edible, air-breathing land snail, a terrestrial pulmonate gastropod mollusk in the family Helicidae, the typical snails.

This species is endemic to Sicily. It is threatened by habitat loss.

References

External links 

 Animal Base info

Helix (gastropod)
Fauna of Italy
Endemic fauna of Italy
Gastropods described in 1832
Taxonomy articles created by Polbot
Taxobox binomials not recognized by IUCN